The Contrast Rocks are a small group of rocks  east of Antarctic Point, along the north coast of South Georgia. The group was charted and named in the period 1926–30 by Discovery Investigations personnel.

References 

Rock formations of South Georgia